A number of units of measurement were used in Mexico to measure length, mass, area, capacity, etc. The Metric system was optional from 1857, and has been compulsory since 1896.

System before metric system
The Units of the system (from Spanish, Castillian) were legally defined during the transition period of the metric system.

Length
A number of units were used.  One vara (lit. "pole", "yard") was equal to 0.838 m (32.99 inches) as it was legally defined also use inches and feet.  Some other units and legal equivalents are given below:

1 linea (lit. "line") =  vara

1 pulgada (lit. "thumbful", "inch") =  vara

1 pie (lit. "foot") =  vara

1 milla (lit. "mile") = 5000 pies

1 legua (lit. "league") = 5000 varas.

Mass

A number of units were used.  One libra (lit. "pound") was equal to  kg as it was legally defined.  Some other units and legal equivalents are given below:

1 tomin =  libra

1 adarme =  libra

1 ochava ("eighth") =  libra

1 onza ("ounce") =  libra

1 arroba = 25 libras

1 quintal ("hundredweight") = 100 libras

1 terco = 160 libras

Area

A number of units were used.  One fanega was equal to  m2 as it was legally defined.  Some other units and legal equivalents are given below:

1 caballeria = 12 fanegas

1 labor = 18 fanegas

1 sitio = 492.28 fanegas.

Capacity

Two systems, dry and liquid, were used.

Dry

Several units were used.  One cuartillo (lit. "quart") was equal to 1.8918 L as it was legally defined. Some other units and legal equivalents are given below:

1 almud ("gallon") = 4 cuartillos

1 fanega = 48 cuartillos

1 carga = 96 cuartillos.

Liquid

Several units were used.  Some units and legal equivalents are given below:

1 cuartillo (for wine) =  L

1 cuartillo (for oil) =  L

1 jarra = 18 cuartillos.

One frasco was equal to  quarts, and one baril was equal to 20 gallons, with local variations.

References

Mexican culture
Mexico